Brutieridin is a flavanone glycoside. Brutieridin was discovered in bergamot orange juice and exhibits statin-like properties as well as an anticholesterolaemic effect. As a result, the juice seems to have hypolipidemic (lipid-lowering) activity.

References

Bibliography

See also
Melitidin

External links

Flavanone glycosides
Flavonoid rutinosides
Flavonoids found in Rutaceae